Sven Lintjens (born 5 October 1976) is a German former professional footballer who played as an attacking midfielder.

References

External links

1976 births
Living people
Sportspeople from Mönchengladbach
German footballers
Footballers from North Rhine-Westphalia
Association football midfielders
Borussia Mönchengladbach II players
Borussia Mönchengladbach players
1. FC Saarbrücken players
SG Wattenscheid 09 players
Rot-Weiss Essen players
Sportfreunde Siegen players
SC Fortuna Köln players
SC Paderborn 07 players
Wuppertaler SV players
MVV Maastricht players
2. Bundesliga players
3. Liga players
Regionalliga players
Eerste Divisie players
German expatriate footballers
German expatriate sportspeople in the Netherlands
Expatriate footballers in the Netherlands